The Great Hits of Glen Campbell was issued by Capitol Records and sold exclusively through a special TV offer.

Track listing
Side 1:

 "Gentle On My Mind" (John Hartford) - 2:56
 "Wichita Lineman" (Jimmy Webb) - 2:58
 "Galveston" (Jimmy Webb) - 2:40
 "I Wanna Live" (John D. Loudermilk) - 2:42
 "Where's The Playground Suzie" (Jimmy Webb) - 3:00

Side 2:

 "By The Time I Get To Phoenix" (Jimmy Webb) - 2:43
 "Try A Little Kindness" (Austin, Sapaugh) - 2:23
 "Dream Baby (How Long Must I Dream)" (Cindy Walker) - 2:37
 "It's Only Make Believe" (Conway Twitty, Jack Nance) - 2:18
 "Amazing Grace" (John Newton) - 4:24

Side 3:

 "Rhinestone Cowboy" (Larry Weiss) - 3:06
 "Dreams of the Everyday Housewife" (Chris Gantry) - 2:45
 "Honey Come Back" (Jimmy Webb) - 3:00
 "Bonaparte's Retreat" (King, Stewart) - 2:48
 "Everything A Man Could Ever Need" (Mac Davis) - 2:26

Side 4:

 "Country Boy (You Got Your Feet In LA)" (Dennis Lambert, Brian Potter) - 3:05
 "I Knew Jesus (Before He Was A Superstar)" (Hefti, Styne) - 2:50
 "Southern Nights" (Allen Toussaint) - 3:07
 "Don't Pull Your Love/Then You Can Tell Me Goodbye" (Dennis Lambert, Brian Potter, John D. Loudermilk) - 3:18
 "Oh Happy Day" (Edwin Hawkins) - 3:38

Production
Art direction - Roy Kohara
Design - Ken Anderson
Photography - Brian D. McLaughlin

1978 compilation albums
Glen Campbell compilation albums
Capitol Records compilation albums